Down Where the Spirit Meets the Bone is the 11th studio album by American singer-songwriter Lucinda Williams. The double album was released on September 30, 2014. It is the first album on Williams' own Highway 20 Records label.  The song "Compassion", from which the album title is derived, is based on a poem by her father, Miller Williams. 

The album won the Americana Music Award for Album of the Year in 2015, while the track "East Side of Town" was nominated for Song of the Year. In 2017, the song "When I Look at the World" was covered by Kaitlin Doubleday as her character Jessie Caine on season five of the TV series Nashville.

Reception

Critical
The album received acclaim from music critics. At Metacritic, which assigns a normalized rating out of 100 to reviews from mainstream critics, the album received an average score of 83 based on 19 reviews, which indicates "universal acclaim". "[T]hough this doesn't always sound like an album where Williams is challenging herself musically, for a musician who has long believed in the power of nuance, this is an album that feels unerringly right for her, full of sweet and sour blues, acoustic pondering, and simple, bare bones rock & roll that slips into the groove with Williams' literate but unpretentious songs," writes Mark Deming at AllMusic. The New York Times says, "On past albums Ms. Williams has portrayed herself at moments of rage, excess and grief; now she prefers stability. Her songs are fully aware of wounds and pitfalls, but they’re more likely to be looking back or looking outward."  Tom Moon writes at NPR, "She's always been able to conjure brokenhearted misery from a single note; now, she can ramp up to fury that quickly, too. And resignation. And let's face it: In terms of pure expression, no singer in popular music can touch Williams when she's calling from the lonely outskirts of Despairville. She sounds like it's her permanent residence, that place down deep where the spirit meets the bone."

Commercial
The album debuted on the Billboard 200 at No. 13 on its release. It also debuted at No. 1 on the Folk Albums and No. 2 on the Top Rock Albums charts, with 20,000 copies sold for the week. The album has sold 92,000 copies in the US as of January 2016.

Guest appearances
Guest appearances on the album include harmony vocals by Jakob Dylan on the song "It's Gonna Rain", guitar by Tony Joe White on two songs, and keyboards by Ian McLagan on five songs. Elvis Costello's backing group plays on a few songs with Stuart Mathis of The Wallflowers. Bill Frisell plays guitar on two songs.

Track listing
All songs written by Lucinda Williams, except where noted.

Personnel
 Lucinda Williams – vocals, acoustic guitar
 Tony Joe White – electric guitar, harmonica
 Greg Leisz – acoustic and electric guitars, lap steel guitar, backing vocals
 Val McCallum – electric guitar
 Stuart Mathis – electric guitar
 Jonathan Wilson – guitar
 Patrick Warren – chamberlin, organ, piano, pump organ, autoharp, keyboards
 Ian "Mac" McLagan – Wurlitzer, piano 
 Davey Faragher – bass
 Pete Thomas – drums and percussion
 Gia Ciambotti – backing vocals
 Doug Pettibone – electric guitar, backing vocals

Additional musicians:

 Jakob Dylan – harmony vocals
 Bill Frisell – electric guitar
 Bob Glaub – bass
 Sebastian Steinberg – bass
 David Sutton – bass
 David Ralicke – saxophone, euphonium
 Jordan Katz – trumpet
 Butch Norton – drums

Charts

References

External links 
 
Lucinda Williams Official Website

Lucinda Williams albums
2014 albums